Abbasabad-e Amelak (also Romanized as ‘Abbāsābād-e Āmelāḵ; also known as ‘Abāsābād) is a village in Chehel Chay Rural District, in the Central District of Minudasht County, Golestan Province, Iran. At the 2006 census, its population was 604, in 122 families.

References 

Populated places in Minudasht County